Michael Gannon is a Western Australian obstetrician and gynaecologist. Dr Michael Gannon is a former president of the Australian Medical Association (AMA) 2016–2018 and AMA (WA) 2014–2016.

Under Dr Gannon’s leadership the AMA recommended a precautionary principle on access to e-cigarettes, pointing to existing evidence on the harms of vaping.

References

https://insightplus.mja.com.au/2018/3/ama-responds-to-e-cigarettes-debate/

https://www.canceraustralia.gov.au/sites/default/files/superceded_statement_on_e-cigarettes_february_2018_0.pdf

Living people
Year of birth missing (living people)
Presidents of the Australian Medical Association
People from Western Australia